Omoglymmius solitarius is a species of beetle in the subfamily Rhysodidae (wrinkled bark beetles). It was described by Arrow in 1942.

References

solitarius
Beetles described in 1942